Quantic may refer to:

 Quantic, an older name for a homogeneous polynomial.
 Quantic Dream, a video game developer studio
 Will Holland, musician and producer with stage name Quantic
 Quantic School of Business and Technology, an online graduate school

See also

 Quantum (disambiguation)